Curug may refer to:
 Curug, Serang, a village in Serang, Banten, Indonesia
 Curug, Tangerang, a subdistrict of Tangerang Regency, Banten, Indonesia
 Čurug, a village near Žabalj, South Bačka District, Serbia